The 2013 Champion Hurdle was a horse race held at Cheltenham Racecourse on Tuesday 10 March 2013. It was the 83rd running of the Champion Hurdle.

The winner was George Creighton & Rose Boyd's Hurricane Fly, a nine-year-old gelding trained in Ireland by Willie Mullins and ridden by Ruby Walsh. The horse had previously won the race in 2011 with the same owner, trainer and rider, and became only the second horse to regain the title after the 1973 and 1975 champion Comedy of Errors. 

Hurricane Fly won by two and a half lengths from Rock On Ruby, who had beaten him into fourth place in the 2012 running of the race. The 2010 winner Binocular finished fifth. Six of the nine runners completed the course.

Race details
 Sponsor: Stan James
 Purse: £370,000; First prize: £227,800
 Going: Soft
 Distance: 2 miles 110 yards
 Number of runners: 9
 Winner's time: 3m 59.35

Full result

 Abbreviations: nse = nose; nk = neck; hd = head; dist = distance; UR = unseated rider; PU = pulled up

Winner's details
Further details of the winner, Hurricane Fly.
 Sex: Gelding
 Foaled: 5 April 2004
 Country: Ireland
 Sire: Montjeu; Dam: Scandisk (Kenmare)
 Owner: George Creighton & Rose Boyd
 Breeder: Agricola Del Parco

References

Champion Hurdle
 2013
Champion Hurdle
Champion Hurdle
2010s in Gloucestershire